Zarrineh Rural District is a rural district (dehestan) in Karaftu District, Divandarreh County, Kurdistan Province, Iran. At the 2006 census, its population was 7,076, in 1,366 families. The rural district has 18 villages.

References 

Rural Districts of Kurdistan Province
Divandarreh County